Battle of Philippopolis or Battle of Plovdiv may refer to:

Siege of Philippopolis (250)
Battle of Philippopolis (1208)
Battle of Philippopolis (1878)